Memento is an Australian hard rock band based out of the United States. Formed in 2001, the band disbanded in 2004 after the release of their debut album. After a two-year absence, the band re-emerged in 2006 under the name Nine Times Bodyweight, which itself disbanded after a year and without any further releases.

History

Formation
Formed in 2001, Memento was composed of Australian natives in vocalist-keyboardist Justin Stewart Cotta, guitarist Space (Jason Smith), bassist Leighton "Lats" Kearns, and American drummer Steve Clark.

The band released their debut album Beginnings on 25 February 2003. Two singles were released from the album, "Nothing Sacred" and "Saviour," and a music video for "Coming" was produced as well. Both "Nothing Sacred" and "Saviour" made a moderate impact on the US mainstream rock charts. Memento was also part of the 2003 Ozzfest tour as a rotating second stage act.

First break-up and re-emergence
Due to personal conflicts amongst the band members, as well as record label issues, the band was dissolved in late 2004. Cotta and Kearns re-emerged as Man vs Clock in 2005. In early 2006, Memento reformed with a new drummer, Jeff Bowders, under the new name Nine Times Bodyweight, or "9xB." The band went to work recording new material. However, the project didn't last, and disbanded in early 2007.  No official statement was publicly released as to why the group dissolved.

Second break-up and solo ventures
Following the band's second break-up, Kearns toured the United States with Sunflower Dead.

Cotta went on to pursue a solo career under the names "Justin Cotta and The Tenderhooks" and "Justin Stewart Cotta". Cotta is currently signed to EMI as a solo artist. His work is currently not for sale nor available for download. Cotta splits his time between music, theatre and film. As an actor, he was featured as Eugene in the American film Boys and Girls' Guide to Getting Down, for which he and the cast won best ensemble cast at the Los Angeles Indie Film Awards. Cotta had a lead role in the world premiere of David Williamson's play Let the Sunshine, in which a live version of his original song "Innocent Girl" was featured. Some of Cotta's finest musical work comes in the form of an original soundtrack for the award-winning short film One. The film is a finalist for Tropfest 2010, the world's largest short film festival. 

Guitarist Jason "Space" Smith has begun his own solo project under the name mononym Space. Joining him are former Nine Times Bodyweight drummer Jeff Bowders on drums and Jack Morrice of Driveblind. Signed with Captiva Records, Space's debut album, When Clouds Align, was set for release through in early 2008, with his second release, Exit Strategies, released later the same year. Space played all instruments on When Clouds Align save for drums, which were split between T-Bone and Steve Clark, and was responsible for the production and mixing of the album.

Outside of his solo project, Space has written with Kevin Martin previously on The Hiwatts' 2003 release The Possibility of Being and has teamed up again with Martin to write the song "Stand" for the forthcoming Candlebox album. Space has also worked with Seether, who released their third studio release on 23 October 2007, entitled Finding Beauty in Negative Spaces. On the album, Space co-wrote and played guitars and E-bow on "Waste."

In 2018 Jason "Space" Smith and Justin Cotta when back into the studio and released a single, "Legacy".

Digital Daggers
Since 2008, Memento guitarist Jason "Space" Smith teamed up with Canadian songstress Andrea Wasse to form the contemporary duo Digital Daggers. Digital Daggers have since been featured on television shows including The Vampire Diaries, Ringer, Nikita, One Life to Live, Teen Wolf, Pretty Little Liars, Degrassi: The Next Generation, Unforgettable, and CSI: NY. Songs by Digital Daggers have also been featured in the 2011 film The Roommate and Electronic Arts' Crysis 2 video game, with the latter containing a cover of "New York City."

In late 2010 Digital Daggers had the single of the week, "No Easy Way," which gained over 150,000 downloads to promote the release of the debut digital EP Human Emotion. The title track of the EP was used by Ferrero Raffaello for a TV commercial in 2011.

Their debut full-length album Close Your Eyes was released on 11 June 2013 by Los Angeles-based indie label El Camino Media. The song "The Devil Within" is currently being featured in trailers for the NBC series The Blacklist, Nikita, and Pretty Little Liars. In February 2014, they released "Aquarius" from the album 'Reimaginations: Volume One', which was used in the first episode of the CW show "Starcrossed".

Digital Daggers released their 2nd and final full-length album Mixed Emotions in 2014. The band had broken up before its release and have since had songs from the album featured in the TV Series How To Get Away With Murder.

The song "Back To The Start" is featured on the upcoming Official Soundtrack album for How To Get Away With Murder released on Hollywood Records March 2016. Orange is the New Black featured "Save Us From Ourselves" in Season 7, Episode 4: "How to Do Life." The song begins as Maria recites from a pamphlet "Take what you want and leave the rest." Meanwhile Piper steals her coworkers' tequila and cookie cake, Mr. Caputo reads aloud to his support group, Gloria researches immigration lawyers, Taystee prepares and attempts suicide by hanging, and Lorna searches for baby pictures online  in mourning of her deceased infant son.

On 9 November 2017, Digital Daggers announced their return to the stage by presenting their newest song, "Devil's Choir".

Space has been heavily active in the film and TV sync world as an artist, producer and performer, especially with his band Digital Daggers.

Members

Memento line-up
 Justin Stewart Cotta – vocals, piano, guitar
 Space (Jason Smith) – guitar
 Leighton "Lats" Kearns – bass
 Steve Clark – drums

Nine Times Bodyweight line-up
 Justin Stewart Cotta – lead vocals, keyboard
 Space (Jason Smith) – guitar
 Leighton "Lats" Kearns – bass
 Jeff Bowders – drums

Memento line-up 2016
 Justin Stewart Cotta – vocals, piano, guitar
 Space (Jason Smith) – guitar, vocals, piano, production
 Leighton Kearns - Bass

Discography

Album(s)

They released a new single in 2018 titled "Legacy"

Singles

References

External links
 Official site
 
 

American hard rock musical groups
Australian hard rock musical groups
American alternative metal musical groups
Musical groups established in 2001
Musical groups disestablished in 2007
Australian alternative metal musical groups